The Community acquis or acquis communautaire, sometimes called the EU acquis and often shortened to acquis, is the accumulated legislation, legal acts and court decisions that constitute the body of European Union law that came into being since 1993. The term is French: acquis meaning "that which has been acquired or obtained", and communautaire meaning "of the community".

Chapters
During the process of the enlargement of the European Union, the acquis was divided into 31 chapters for the purpose of negotiation between the EU and the candidate member states for the fifth enlargement (the ten that joined in 2004 plus Romania and Bulgaria which joined in 2007). These chapters were:

Free movement of goods
Free movement of persons
Freedom to provide services
Free movement of capital
Company law
Competition policy
Agriculture
Fisheries
Transport policy
Taxation
Economic and Monetary Union
Statistics
Social policy and employment
Energy
Industrial policy
Small and medium-sized enterprises
Science and research
Education and training
Telecommunication and information technologies
Culture and audio-visual policy
Regional policy and co-ordination of structural instruments
Environment
Consumers and health protection
Cooperation in the field of Justice and Home Affairs
Customs union
External relations
Common Foreign and Security Policy (CFSP)
Financial control
Financial and budgetary provisions
Institutions
Others

For the negotiations with Croatia (which joined in 2013), Iceland, Turkey, Montenegro, Serbia and in the future, with North Macedonia, Albania (candidate countries), the acquis is split up into 35 chapters instead, with the purpose of better balancing between the chapters: (dividing the most difficult ones into separate chapters for easier negotiation, uniting some easier chapters, moving some policies between chapters, as well as renaming a few of them in the process)

Free movement of goods
Freedom of movement for workers
Right of establishment and freedom to provide services
Free movement of capital
Public procurement
Company law
Intellectual property law
Competition policy
Financial services
Information society and media
Agriculture and rural development
Food safety, veterinary and phytosanitary policy
Fisheries
Transport policy
Energy
Taxation
Economic and monetary policy
Statistics
Social policy and employment (including anti-discrimination and equal opportunities for women and men)
Enterprise and industrial policy
Trans-European networks
Regional policy and co-ordination of structural instruments
Judiciary and fundamental rights
Justice, freedom and security
Science and research
Education and culture
Environment
Consumer and health protection
Customs union
External relations
Foreign, security and defence policy
Financial control
Financial and budgetary provisions
Institutions
Other issues

Correspondence between chapters of the 5th and the 6th Enlargement:

Such negotiations usually involved agreeing transitional periods before new member states needed to implement the laws of the European Union fully and before they and their citizens acquired full rights under the acquis.

Terminology
The term acquis is also used to describe laws adopted under the Schengen Agreement, prior to its integration into the European Union legal order by the Treaty of Amsterdam, in which case one speaks of the Schengen acquis.

The term acquis has been borrowed by the World Trade Organization Appellate Body, in the case Japan – Taxes on Alcoholic Beverages, to refer to the accumulation of General Agreement on Tariffs and Trade (GATT) and WTO law ("acquis gattien"), though this usage is not well established.

It has been used to describe the achievements of the Council of Europe (an international organisation unconnected with the European Union):

It has also been applied to the body of "principles, norms and commitments" of the Organization for Security and Co-operation in Europe (OSCE):

The Organisation for Economic Co-operation and Development (OECD) introduced the concept of the OECD Acquis in its "Strategy for enlargement and outreach", May 2004.

See also
 Official Journal of the European Union
 Primacy of European Union law

References

External links

EUR-Lex: European Union Law.
JRC-Acquis, Aligned multilingual parallel corpus: 23,000 Acquis-related texts per language, available in 22 languages. Total size: 1 Billion words.
Translation Memory of the EU-Acquis: Up to 1 Million translation units each, for 231 language pairs.

European Union constitutional law